Iyouella is an extinct genus of trilobite in the order Olenellida.

References

Trilobites
Articles created by Qbugbot